Booked! was a radio programme that originally aired from October 1995 to April 2000.  There were thirty 35-minute episodes and it was broadcast on BBC Radio 4.  It starred Ian McMillan, Mark Thomas, David Stafford, Stuart Maconie, Linda Smith, Dillie Keane, Miles Kington, and Roger McGough.

References 
 Lavalie, John. Booked! EpGuides. 21 Jul 2005. 29 Jul 2005  <https://web.archive.org/web/20070608000620/http://epguides.com/Booked/%3E.

BBC Radio 4 programmes
British radio game shows
1990s British game shows
2000s British game shows
1995 radio programme debuts